Jing Ju (died 208 BC) was one of the leaders during the Dazexiang Uprising against the Qin Dynasty.

Upon hearing the news of Chen Sheng defeated by the Qin forces and uncertain about his death, his subordinate Qin Jia (秦嘉) persuaded him to claim the title of "King of Chu" (楚王). Shortly after, the Chu general Xiang Liang claimed that Jing Ju had betrayed Chen Sheng by claiming the latter's title, so he sent Ying Bu to defeat Qin Jia, which resulted in executions for both Qin Jia and Jing Ju.

Jing Ju encompasses chinese history and is a display of historical events through on stage drama.

References

Chinese generals
Chinese nobility
Qin dynasty rebels
208 BC deaths
Year of birth unknown
3rd-century BC births